Keezhattingal is a village in Thiruvananthapuram district in the state of Kerala, India.

History 
Attingal palace only 1 km from here. historical famous temple subrahmanya swamy temple situated here. first indian riot against British, Attingal Outbreak (Angengo revolt) in 1721 started from keezhattingal. Elappuram the out skirt of keezhattingal is the exact place native revolt started against British with the silent support of Rani of Attingal.

Demographics
 India census, Keezhattingal had a population of 14129 with 6484 males and 7645 females.

References

Villages in Thiruvananthapuram district